The Student of Prague (also known as A Bargain with Satan) is a 1913 German silent horror film. It is loosely based on "William Wilson", a short story by Edgar Allan Poe, the poem The December Night by Alfred de Musset, and Faust. The film was remade in 1926, under the same title The Student of Prague. Other remakes were produced in 1935 and 2004. The film stars Paul Wegener in his film debut. It is generally deemed to be the first art film in history of German movies, but the french film The Assassination of the Duke of Guise (L'assassinat du duc de Guise), produced in 1908, is the first art film in history.

It was shot at the Babelsberg Studios and on location around Prague. The film's sets were designed by the art director Robert A. Dietrich.

Plot summary
In Prague in 1820, a poor university student named Balduin is the city's wildest carouser and greatest swordsman. Despondent over his lack of funds, he is approached by a diabolical old gentleman dressed in black named Scapinelli. A local young woman named Lyduschka is infatuated with Balduin and begins to follow most of the action from a distance. Balduin becomes smitten with Countess Margit Schwarzenberg after rescuing her from drowning, but — despite receiving a locket from her — knows he cannot pursue this love because of his poverty. Scapinelli, who is always in a gleeful mood, offers Balduin 100,000 pieces of gold in exchange for any item to be found in his student lodgings. Balduin agrees and signs a contract thinking he owns nothing, but is astonished when Scapinelli calls forth Balduin's reflection from the mirror and absconds with it. The baffled student realizes that he now produces no mirror image.

Recovering, Balduin — now flush with cash — attempts to woo Countess Margit. At the Hofburg Palace, the resplendently attired Balduin renews his acquaintanceship with the Countess, but both Lyduschka and his mirror double put in appearances before the Countess covertly gifts Balduin with her handkerchief. Balduin and the Countess meet secretly at an old Jewish graveyard, but the double appears again and terrorizes both lovers. Lyduschka tips off Baron Waldis-Schwarzenberg, the Countess's fiancé and cousin, about Balduin's amorous efforts (she has stolen the handkerchief as evidence). Incensed, the Baron challenges Balduin to a duel with sabres.

Privately, Count Schwarzenberg — the Countess's father and the Baron's uncle — begs Balduin not to kill the Baron, as he is the last surviving heir to the family. Balduin agrees but is thwarted when his double again appears at the duel in his place and kills the rival suitor. Distraught, Balduin sneaks into Margit’s room and continues to petition for her affections. She is accommodating, but becomes frightened by Balduin's lack of a mirror reflection followed quickly by the sudden appearance of the double. She collapses in a swoon.

Utterly dejected, Balduin returns to his own now lavish lodgings and retrieves a pistol. When the double appears there he fires at it and it vanishes, but soon he becomes stricken himself and falls dead. Scapinelli arrives, takes the contract Balduin signed with him and tears it up, throws it like confetti and departs happily. In a coda, we see Balduin's double sitting atop his fresh grave, stroking a raven, and glowering menacingly at the viewer.

Cast
 Paul Wegener as Balduin
 John Gottowt as Scapinelli
 Grete Berger as Countess Margit
 Lyda Salmonova as Lyduschka
 Lothar Körner as Count von Schwarzenberg
 Fritz Weidemann as Baron Waldis-Schwarzenberg

Cultural significance
The Student of Prague is considered to be the first German art film, and it helped lift cinema from its low-class, fairground origins to a viable art form. It was a critical and commercial success.  Audiences flocked to see the film, in part because it tapped into a very real sense of dissociation and alienation inherent in a society that was struggling with the burgeoning collapse of the German Empire.

The film's star, Paul Wegener, was an avowed champion of the medium after realizing the potential of cinema to transcend the limits of conventional theater. Cinematographer Guido Seeber utilized groundbreaking camera tricks to create the effect of the Doppelgänger (mirror double), producing a seamless double exposure. Hanns Heinz Ewers was a noted writer of horror and fantasy stories whose involvement with the screenplay lent a much needed air of respectability to the fledgling art form.

The film also stimulated interest in the still very new field of psychoanalysis. Otto Rank published an extensive plot summary of the film in his article “Der Doppelgänger,” which ran in Sigmund Freud's academic journal Imago in 1914. Examples of the Doppelgänger are most prevalent in literature as a narcissistic defense against sexual love, according to Rank, who described how the mirror image of the student shows up in erotic situations to deny Balduin any progress in his attempts to woo the countess.

The fantastic themes of the film went on to become a major influence on Weimar cinema, continuing the exploration of social change and insecurity in the aftermath of World War I. Expressionism grew out of the tormented psyches of artists and writers coming to terms with their individual experiences. The use of chiaroscuro (sharp contrasts between light and shadow) was already established on the set of The Student of Prague, but was then carried further by Weimar productions like Das Cabinet des Dr. Caligari.

References in popular culture

The film is referenced in the 1933 detective story "The Image in the Mirror" by Dorothy Sayers, in which Lord Peter Wimsey helps clear Mr. Duckworthy, a man wrongly suspected of murder. Among other things Duckworthy tells: 
"When I was seven or eight, my mother took me with her to see a film called "The Student of Prague".(...) It was a costume piece about a young man at the university who sold himself to the devil, and one day his reflection came stalking out of the mirror on its own, and went about committing dreadful crimes, so that everybody thought it was him." 
(In the story, Mr. Duckworthy had what seemed a similar experience - but Wimsey eventually proves that it had a rational explanation involving no supernatural agency).

References

External links 
 
 
 
 

1913 films
1913 horror films
1910s German-language films
1910s fantasy films
1910s historical horror films
German horror films
German historical fantasy films
German black-and-white films
Films of the German Empire
German silent feature films
Films directed by Paul Wegener
Films based on works by Hanns Heinz Ewers
Films based on works by Alfred de Musset
Films based on works by Edgar Allan Poe
Films set in Prague
Films shot at Babelsberg Studios
Films set in the 1820s
Articles containing video clips
Films shot in the Czech Republic
Silent horror films
1910s German films